Chitrouni is a village on the island of Anjouan in the Comoros. According to the 1991 census, the village had a population of 672. The current estimate for 2009 is 1,184 people.

References

Populated places in Anjouan